The 2018–19 Creighton Bluejays women's basketball team represents Creighton University in the 2018–19 NCAA Division I women's basketball season. The Bluejays, led by sixteenth year head coach Jim Flanery, play their home games at D. J. Sokol Arena and were members of the Big East Conference. They finished the season 15–16, 8–10 in Big East play to finish in a tie for seventh place. They advanced to the semifinals of the Big East women's tournament where they lost to DePaul.

Roster

Schedule

|-
!colspan=9 style=|Exhibition

|-
!colspan=9 style=| Non-conference regular season

|-
!colspan=9 style=| Big East regular season

|-
!colspan=9 style=| Big East Women's Tournament

Rankings
2018–19 NCAA Division I women's basketball rankings

See also
2018–19 Creighton Bluejays men's basketball team

References

Creighton
Creighton Bluejays women's basketball seasons
Creighton Bluejays
Creighton Bluejays